Simon Keogh (born 1979) is a retired rugby union player who played on the wing and scrum half for Leinster Rugby and for Harlequins F.C.

In 2000, Simon was named Leinster Rugby Young Player of the Year.

In 2004, whilst playing with Harlequins F.C. he won the Challenge Cup scoring the winning try in injury-time against Clermont-Ferrand (now ASM Clermont Auvergne). He was named Supporters' Player of the Year for Harlequins in the 2005/06 season. After returning to Leinster Rugby, he has won the Heineken Cup with them in 2009.

He also represented Ireland A's  travelling to the 2006 Churchill Cup in San Hose and to the 2009 Churchill Cup in Colorado.

Upon retirement, Simon qualified as a solicitor and is now CEO of Rugby Players Ireland the representative body for professional rugby players in Ireland.

References

External links 
 Leinster profile
 Profile on ESPNscrum.com

Living people
Leinster Rugby players
Irish rugby union players
1979 births
People educated at St Michael's College, Dublin
Ireland Wolfhounds international rugby union players
Alumni of University College Dublin
Alumni of Dublin Business School
Old Belvedere R.F.C. players
Rugby union players from Dublin (city)
Irish expatriate rugby union players
Irish expatriate sportspeople in England
Expatriate rugby union players in England
Harlequin F.C. players